HMS Auriga (P419/S69), was an  of the Royal Navy, built by Vickers Armstrong and launched 29 March 1945.

Design
Auriga had a displacement of  when at the surface and  while submerged. The submarine was powered by two Admiralty ML eight-cylinder diesel engines generating  each. Four electric motors each producing  drove two shafts.

Armament was ten  torpedo tubes, one QF 4 inch naval gun Mk XXIII, one Oerlikon 20 mm cannon, and a .303 British Vickers machine gun. Its torpedo tubes were fitted to the bow and stern, and it could carry twenty torpedoes. Its complement was sixty-one crew members.

Service history
In 1953 she took part in the Fleet Review to celebrate the Coronation of Queen Elizabeth II. In March 1961, the submarine was among the vessels that took part in a combined naval exercise with the United States Navy off Nova Scotia. Auriga departed Canada on 25 April 1961 after completing an 18-month tour with the Sixth Submarine Division at Halifax, Nova Scotia.

References

Publications

External links
 Pictures of HMS Auriga at MaritimeQuest

 

Amphion-class submarines
Cold War submarines of the United Kingdom
Ships built in Barrow-in-Furness
1945 ships